The Osage Farms Resettlement Properties in Pettis County, Missouri is a National Register of Historic Places multiple property submission located at Pettis County, Missouri.  The submission includes 10 national historic districts and 2 individual properties listed on the National Register of Historic Places.  The properties included were built by the Resettlement Administration / Farm Security Administration in 1937 as model farms and known as Osage Farms.  Model farmsteads typically included a -story frame dwelling, barn, poultry house and privy.

The following were listed on the National Register of Historic Places in 1991.

 Bois d'Arc Cooperative Dairy Farm Historic District (NRHP 91001407): The six contributing buildings are a large dairy barn with a milking wing, a horse and bull barn, three farmhouses and a food storage building.  It served as the nucleus of a 2,000 acre cooperative dairy operation from 1937 to 1943.
 Hillview Cooperative Dairy Farm Historic District (NRHP 91001399): The seven contributing buildings and three contributing structures are a large dairy barn with a milking wing, two silos, two poultry houses, a granary, a reconditioned horse barn, two dwellings, and a well house.  It encompasses the nucleus of two experimental cooperative farms.
 Osage Farms Type 315:13 Government Farmhouse (NRHP 91001406): It is a -story frame farmhouse with a gambrel roof of type 315:13.  It was moved to its present location about 1959.
 Osage Farms Unit No. 1 Historic District (NRHP 91001408): The four contributing buildings are the farmhouse, barn, a poultry house, and food storage building.  It was the prototypical individual government farmstead constructed at Osage Farms.
 Osage Farms Unit No. 25 Historic District (NRHP 91001405): The four contributing buildings are the farmhouse, barn, a poultry house, and food storage building.  It was one of a contiguous grouping of five individual farmsteads along Houston and High Point Roads.
 Osage Farms Unit No. 26 Historic District (NRHP 91001409): The four contributing buildings are the farmhouse, barn, a poultry house, and food storage building.  It was part of a grouping of several more or less contiguous individual government farmsteads near the center of the Osage Farms project area.
 Osage Farms Unit No. 30 Historic District (NRHP 91001401): The three contributing buildings are the barn, a privy, and food storage building.  The government privy is perhaps the only intact example of its type extant in the Osage Farms project area.
 Osage Farms Unit No. 31 (NRHP 91001402): The property includes a wood frame, central passage government barn. The barn is typical of those built on nearly all individual government farmsteads at Osage Farms.
 Osage Farms Unit No. 41 (NRHP 91001403): The property includes a frame and cinder block side-passage government barn. It was the only Type 411:5 barn erected at Osage Farms.
 Osage Farms Unit No. 43 Historic District (NRHP 91001410): The four contributing buildings are the farmhouse, two poultry houses, and a food storage building.  It was part of an individual government farmstead in the Osage Farms resettlement community.
 Osage Farms Units No. 5 and No. 6 Historic District (NRHP 91001404): The four contributing buildings are the farmhouse, two barns, and a food storage building.  The buildings are on what had been two contiguous individual farmsteads in the Osage Farms resettlement community.  All building have been demolished.
 Osage Farms Units No. 8 and No. 9 Historic District (NRHP 91001400): The six contributing buildings are the farmhouse, two barns, two poultry houses, and a food storage building.  The buildings are on what had been two contiguous individual farmsteads in the Osage Farms resettlement community.

References

New Deal in Missouri
Historic districts on the National Register of Historic Places in Missouri
Farms on the National Register of Historic Places in Missouri
Buildings and structures completed in 1937
Buildings and structures in Pettis County, Missouri
National Register of Historic Places in Pettis County, Missouri